Girl Defined is a Christian lifestyle blog and YouTube channel run by sisters Bethany Beal and Kristen Clark which focuses on purity culture and navigating mainstream America as an evangelical.

History 
The success of Girl Defined was built off the failure of the sister's first project, bairdsisters.com. After bairdsisters.com failed to gain traction the pair rebranded to focus on high school and college aged girls.

In 2016 the sisters began posting videos on YouTube and published their first book, Girl Defined: God’s Radical Design for Beauty, Femininity, and Identity.

In 2018 Girl Defined became a meme after YouTubers Cody Ko and Noel Miller featured Girl Defined's content on their series That's Cringe. This began a trend in which influencers and regular people made videos parodying and mocking Girl Defined.

In the 2020s the sisters started posting on the platform TikTok.

In 2021 Bethany went viral for sharing her story of having her first kiss at 30 during her wedding.

Views 
Girl Defined promotes biblical womanhood. Many of their ideas are borrowed from purity culture which was popular in the 1990s and early 2000s.

Sexuality 
Kissing before marriage is discouraged as are all other sexual or sexually suggestive acts. They advise girls who are attracted to other girls to seek God instead.

Feminism 
Girl Defined has referred to feminism as an “attack on God’s design for womanhood.” They believe that part of the purpose of the community is to support people “taking a stand against feminism.”

See also  
 Abstinence only sex education
 Chastity

References 

Christianity and women